Celtic Legends is a 1991 video game published by Ubisoft.

Gameplay
Celtic Legends is a game in which two sorcerer-generals wage war against each other in the land of Celtika.

Reception

Allen Greenberg reviewed the game for Computer Gaming World, and stated that "Legends is really a respectable piece of work, one only hard-core strategists may wish to avoid. Those casual players who enjoy some depth to their simulations, without the danger of drowning, will probably have a good time with it."

Alan Bunker for Amiga Action called the game "Overwhelmingly addictive and fantastic fun to play", noting how its graphics and sound added to its appeal and depth

Karl Foster for Amiga Power called the game "a real challenge to master even against the computer player" but noted that the two-player option "brings to light numerous new ways of completing the game".

Tom Malcom for Info felt that the game "adds so much pizazz and polish" to the strategy and wargaming genre, and complemented the control interface.

Ed Ricketts for Amiga Format said that despite needing a little more on the effects side, he found it "a really absorbing, and pretty intelligent game that has real long-term potential".

Mike Pattenden for CU Amiga found that the game has "more than enough depth and variety to keep you going" despite its restricted role-playing element.

References

1991 video games
Amiga games
Fantasy video games
Multiplayer and single-player video games
Turn-based strategy video games
Ubisoft games
Video games based on Celtic mythology
Video games developed in France
Video games set on fictional islands
Video games with isometric graphics